Dejčići is a village and a seat of Trnovo municipality, Sarajevo Canton, Federation BiH, Bosnia and Herzegovina.

Demographics 
According to the 2013 census, its population was 160, all Bosniaks.

References

Populated places in Trnovo, Sarajevo